The 2009 Elf Renault Clio Cup United Kingdom with Michelin season began at Brands Hatch on 4 April and finished after 20 races over 10 events at the same circuit on 4 October. The Championship was won by Phil Glew driving for Team Pyro.

Changes for 2009
The Clio Cup 200 was introduced mid-way through the season.

Teams & Drivers
All competitors raced in Renault Clio Cup 197s for the first half of the season and Renault Clio Cup 200s for the second half.

Race calendar and results
The series supported the British Touring Car Championship at nine of the ten rounds. The series skipped the round at Knockhill and instead raced at the World Series by Renault meeting at Silverstone on 4–5 July.

Standings
Points were awarded on a 32, 28, 25, 22, 20, 18, 16, 14, 12, 11, 10, 9, 8, 7, 6, 5, 4, 3, 2, 1 basis to the top 20 finishers in each race, with 2 bonus points for the fastest lap in each race. A driver's best 18 scores counted towards the championship.

Drivers' Championship

Notes:
1. – Phil Glew was docked two points at the second Brands Hatch meeting.
2. – Andrew Herron was docked two points at Croft.
3. – Árón Smith was docked two points at the second Brands Hatch meeting.
4. – Mike Robinson was docked two points at the first Brands Hatch meeting.
5. – Lee Pattison was docked two points at Croft and eight points at Rockingham.
6. – James Colburn was docked two points at Thruxton and four points at the first Silverstone meeting.
7. – Carl Bradley was docked four points at Croft.
8. – Daniel Lloyd was docked two points at Donington Park and six points at the second Silverstone meeting.
9. – Robert Gaffney was docked two points at Snetterton.
10. – Tom Carnaby was docked two points at the first Brands Hatch meeting and four points at the second Brands Hatch meeting.
11. – Alex Dew was docked two points at Thruxton and four points at Donington Park.
12. – Ant Scragg was docked three points at Croft.
13. – Alex Osborne was docked two points at the first Silverstone meeting.
14. – David Shepherd was docked two points at Donington Park.

Entrants' Championship
Points were awarded on the same scale as the drivers' championship but without the fastest lap bonus. An entrant's two highest placed cars in each race scored points and all scores counted towards the championship.

Winter Cup
The Winter Cup was held at Rockingham on 7 November. It was won by Daniel Lloyd driving for Total Control Racing.

Teams & Drivers

Calendar & Winners

Drivers' Championship
Points were awarded on the same scale as the main championship.

Notes:
1. – James Colburn was docked two points in the first race.

External links
 Official website
 Timing Solutions Ltd.

Renault Clio Cup
Renault Clio Cup UK seasons